The Being is a 1983 American horror film written and directed by Jackie Kong in her directorial debut, starring Martin Landau, José Ferrer, Dorothy Malone, comedian Ruth Buzzi, Marianne Gordon, and exploitation film producer Bill Osco, who is billed as "Rexx Coltrane" in the opening credits and "Johnny Commander" in the closing credits.

It focuses on a detective who is trying to solve a string of grisly murders and disappearances. Kong, a recent college graduate, was given a $4.5 million budget from her then-husband Bill Osco to write and direct a film. Principal photography began in 1980 under the title Easter Sunday.

Plot
In the town of Pottsville, Idaho, citizens begin disappearing. Young Michael Smith, son of Marge Smith (Dorothy Malone) is the first to vanish. A young man is decapitated while fleeing from an unseen assailant, and patrons at a drive-in theater are brutally murdered. At each scene, green slime is found. Wanting to get to the bottom of the disappearances but afraid that the publicity might damage the town's potato business, Mayor Gordon Lane (José Ferrer) hires chemical safety engineer Garcon Jones (Martin Landau) to investigate. Also investigating the disappearances is Detective Mortimer Lutz (Bill Osco), who senses that something terrible has befallen the town.

Meanwhile, more and more people disappear, with a puddle of green slime found at each site. With this new string of disappearances Lutz begins to suspect that Jones knows more than he is willing to tell. His suspicions grow when he is attacked by something monstrous while at home, with Lutz barely managing to escape from his attacker.  Lutz confronts Jones about the incident but is told that there is nothing wrong in the area.

The following night while Lutz takes his waitress girlfriend Laurie (Marianne Gordon) home, they are suddenly attacked by a hideous creature. After holing themselves inside a diner they manage to lock it inside a freezer. The couple then contacts Mayor Lane, however when he arrives they discover that the creature has vanished, leaving behind a puddle of green slime. In light of this recent attack, Lutz confronts Jones again who then admits that a highly radioactive creature is responsible. It's revealed that the town is home to one of 2,000 nuclear dump sites in the U.S. and the creature (who is implied to be young Michael Smith) is the resulting mutation due to repeated exposure to the site's radioactive materials. The mutant, while intelligent, is completely psychotic and sensitive to light and is inactive during the day.

Arming themselves with shotguns, Jones and Lutz eventually manage to track the creature down to an abandoned warehouse where they are stalked by the hungry mutant. Jones is soon attacked and disemboweled by the creature, leaving Lutz alone to fend off the creature. Donning a gas mask, Lutz attempts to kill the creature with poison gas but it seems unfazed by the poisonous fumes and tosses Lutz around like a ragdoll. As the creature advances Lutz manages to toss a beaker of acid into the creature's face momentarily stunning it. Taking advantage of the creature's distraction, Lutz grabs a nearby axe and hacks the creature to death, ending the creature's reign of terror.

A new mutation is seen bursting from the ground.

Cast 
 Martin Landau as Garson Jones
 Marianne Gordon as Laurie
 Bill Osco as Detective Mortimer Lutz
 José Ferrer as Mayor Gordon Lane
 Dorothy Malone as Marge Smith
 Ruth Buzzi as Virginia Lane

Cast notes:
Marianne Gordon was married to singer Kenny Rogers at the time, and is billed as "Marianne Gordon Rogers"
 Robin Stille is featured in the drive-in movie.

Production 
Kong, a recent college graduate, was given a $4.5 million budget from then-husband Bill Osco to write and direct a film, despite the fact that she had no professional film-making experience. She stated that she impressed Osco with storyboards and shot breakdowns. Kong wooed Martin Landau by pretending to be an actor interested in his theater workshop, and using the opportunity to give him her script. Impressed with her straightforwardness, he accepted the role. It would mark producer and occasional actor Osco's departure from his previous sexually explicit films such as the 1974 sexploitation film Flesh Gordon. Principal photography began in 1980 under the title Easter Sunday.

Release

Theatrical release
During the film's production it was intended that the film would be released on Easter in 1981. However, the film could not find a distributor for three years, and was finally released on November 18, 1983 under its new title. The Being was a commercial failure, performing poorly at the box office.

Home media
The Being was released on DVD on September 13, 2005 by Shriek Studio in widescreen format with no special features. Shriek Studio released it again on July 31, 2007 as a part its Mutant Monsters Triple Feature which combined it with The Dark and Creatures from the Abyss. It was last released by Code Red as a double feature alongside Cop Killers.

Critical response
Critical response for The Being has been mostly negative, with many criticizing the film's acting, script, editing, and poor lighting.
Scott Weinberg from DVD Talk was among the film's detractors calling the film "Grungy, muddy-looking" he also called it a "blatant Alien ripoff". J. Read from Monstersatplay.com called it "cheap, rushed, and an incongruous mess" stating it as a perfect example of all the bad movies that came out in the 1980s. Allmovie called the film "abysmal", with "clumsy, ham-fisted" direction,"lack of focus", "goofy" effects, and a "leaden, noncharismatic" performance from lead actor and producer Bill Osco. Nevertheless, the reviewer calls it "worthy of note for cinematic trash-fiends", because of its cast, flashes of humor and "oddball qualities". 
TV Guide gave the film a negative review awarding it a score of 1 1/2 out of 4, stating, "The biggest mystery about this mystery-horror film is how the producer ever managed to persuade two Oscar winners (Dorothy Malone and Jose Ferrer) to appear in such cinematic Valium".

Robert Firsching from New York Times panned the film, calling it, "abysmal". Leonard Maltin awarded the film 1 stars out of 4 stating that humor was the film's only saving grace, stating that "it wasn't enough to overcome its Z-grade script and production". Jack Sommersby from eFilmCritic.com gave the film a negative review, writing, " it's not the worst of its type but not quite good enough to warrant a recommendation". Brett Gallman from Oh, the Horror! wrote, "The Being manages an odd, offbeat quality despite its familiarity. It’s a film that features an amorphous killer alien but also takes the time to consider Pottsville’s other plights, such as the impending arrival of a massage parlor that has the moral majority in a tizzy. Osco’s voiceover narration and interior monologues abruptly stop midway through the film, and even the Easter setting is entirely incidental".

Legacy
In spite of the film's critical and commercial failure, The Being would gain a small cult following over the years since its release. Kong would go on to direct Night Patrol (1984) and the 1987 cult horror film Blood Diner.

References 
Notes

Bibliography

External links 

1983 films
1980s exploitation films
1983 horror films
1980s monster movies
1980s science fiction horror films
American exploitation films
American science fiction horror films
American monster movies
1980s English-language films
Films about missing people
Films set in Idaho
Films shot in Idaho
1983 directorial debut films
Films directed by Jackie Kong
1980s American films